is a prefecture of Japan located in the Kansai region of Honshu. Osaka Prefecture borders Hyōgo Prefecture to the northwest, Kyoto Prefecture to the north, Nara Prefecture to the southeast, and Wakayama Prefecture to the south.

Osaka is the capital and largest city of Osaka Prefecture, and the third-largest city in Japan, with other major cities including Sakai, Higashiōsaka, and Hirakata. Osaka Prefecture is the third-most-populous prefecture, but by geographic area the second-smallest; at  it is the second-most densely populated, below only Tokyo. Osaka Prefecture is one of Japan's two "urban prefectures" using the designation fu (府) rather than the standard ken for prefectures, along with Kyoto Prefecture. Osaka Prefecture forms the center of the Keihanshin metropolitan area, the second-most-populated urban region in Japan after the Greater Tokyo area and one of the world's most productive regions by GDP.

History 

Prior to the Meiji Restoration, the modern-day area of Osaka Prefecture was split between Kawachi, Izumi, and Settsu provinces.

Osaka Prefecture was created on June 21, 1868, at the very beginning of the Meiji era. During the instigation of Fuhanken Sanchisei in 1868, the prefecture received its suffix fu, designating it as a prefecture.

On September 1, 1956, the city of Osaka was promoted to a city designated by government ordinance and thereby divided into 24 wards. Sakai became the second city in the prefecture to be promoted to a city designated by government ordinance on April 1, 2006, and was divided into seven wards.

In 2000, Fusae Ota became Japan's first female governor when she replaced Knock Yokoyama, who resigned after prosecution for sexual harassment. Tōru Hashimoto, previously famous as a counselor on television, was elected in 2008 at the age of 38, becoming the youngest governor in Japan.

On June 18, 2018, an earthquake struck the northern region of the prefecture. It killed 4 people and caused minor damage across Greater Osaka.

Proposed reorganisation

In 2010, the Osaka Restoration Association was created with backing by Governor Tōru Hashimoto, with hopes of reforming Osaka Prefecture into the Osaka Metropolis and merging with the City of Osaka. In the 2011 local elections, the association was able to win the majority of the prefectural seats and Hashimoto was elected as mayor of Osaka.

A referendum on the issue was held in 2015 and was defeated with 50.38% of voters opposed to the plan. A second referendum in 2020 was rejected by 50.6% of voters.

Geography 
Osaka Prefecture neighbors the prefectures of Hyōgo and Kyoto in the north, Nara in the east and Wakayama in the south. The west is open to Osaka Bay. The Yodo and Yamato Rivers flow through the prefecture.

Prior to the construction of Kansai International Airport, Osaka was the smallest prefecture in Japan. The artificial island on which the airport was built added enough area to make it slightly larger than Kagawa Prefecture.

As of 1 April 2012, 11% of the total land area of the prefecture was designated as Natural Parks, namely Kongō-Ikoma-Kisen and Meiji no Mori Minō Quasi-National Parks and Hokusetsu and Hannan-Misaki Prefectural Natural Parks.

Municipalities 

Since 2005, Osaka consists of 43 municipalities: 33 cities, nine towns and one village. As of 2021, the 33 cities include two designated major cities, seven core cities and two (transitional) special case cities (after legal abolition in 2015, to be replaced with the core city system in the 2020s).

Mergers 

After the modern reactivation of districts in 1878/79, Osaka, including Sakai which was only merged into Osaka in 1881, consisted of 5 urban districts (-ku) and 27 rural districts (-gun), excluding 15 districts in Yamato Province which was later separated from Osaka as Nara Prefecture in 1887. When the prefectures were subdivided into modern municipalities in 1889, the five urban districts were turned into two district-independent cities: Osaka City and Sakai City, and Osaka's [rural] districts were subdivided into 12 towns and 310 villages. After Osaka City had absorbed many surrounding municipalities in the interwar/Taishō period, the number of municipalities in Osaka had already dropped to 149 by 1953. The Great Shōwa mergers of the 1950s reduced the total to 47 by 1961, including 26 cities by then. The current total of 43 was reached during the Great Heisei mergers in 2005.

Economy 

 

 

The gross prefecture product of Osaka for the fiscal year 2004 was ¥38.7 trillion, second after Tokyo with an increase of 0.9% from the previous year. This represented approximately 48% of the Kinki region. The per capita income was ¥3.0 million, seventh in the nation. Commercial sales the same year was ¥60.1 trillion.

Overshadowed by such globally renowned electronics giants as Panasonic and Sharp, the other side of Osaka's economy can be characterized by its Small and Medium Enterprises (SMEs) activities. The number of SMEs based in Osaka in 2006 was 330,737, accounting for 99.6% of the total number of businesses in the prefecture. While this proportion is similar to other prefectures (the average nationwide was 99.7%), the manufactured output of the SMEs amounted to 65.4% of the total within the prefecture, a rate significantly higher than Tokyo's 55.5%, or Kanagawa's 38.4%. One model from Osaka of serving the public interest and restimulating the regional economy, combined with industry-education cooperation efforts, is the Astro-Technology SOHLA, with its artificial satellite project. Having originally started from a gathering of Higashiosaka based SMEs, Astro-Technology SOHLA has not only grown into a Kansai region-wide group but has also won support from the government, through technology and material support from Japan Aerospace Exploration Agency (JAXA), and financial support from NEDO.

The Osaka Securities Exchange, specializing in derivatives such as Nikkei 225 Futures, is based in Osaka.

There are many electrical, chemical, pharmaceutical, heavy industry, food, and housing companies in Osaka Prefecture.

Major companies

Major factories and research institutes

Demographics 

According to the 2005 Population Census of Japan, Osaka prefecture has a population of 8,817,166, an increase of 12,085, or 0.14%, since the Census of year 2000.

As of 2020 this prefecture has about 99,000 ethnic Korean persons, the largest such population of any prefecture in Japan. Osaka City. As of 2013 most ethnic Korean children attend ordinary Japanese public schools, although some Korean schools operated by the Chongryon and classes for ethnic Koreans had opened in the prefecture. During the Japanese rule of Korea many ethnic Koreans came to the Osaka area to look for work. Many people from Jeju came to the Osaka area after a 1922 ferry line between Osaka and Jeju opened. During World War II Japanese authorities forced additional ethnic Koreans to move to the Osaka area.

Temples and shrines
 Shitennō-ji
 Kanshin-ji
 Sumiyoshi Taisha

Museums 
 National Museum of Ethnology, Japan 
 Open-Air Museum of Old Japanese Farm Houses (Hattori Ryokuchi Park)
 OSTEC (Osaka Science and Technology Center) Exhibition Hall
 Japan Folk Crafts Museum, Osaka 大阪日本民芸館

Education 
Public elementary and junior high schools in the prefecture are operated by the municipalities. Public high schools are operated by the Osaka Prefectural Board of Education.

Universities
 Kansai Medical University (Hirakata, Osaka)
 Osaka University (Toyonaka and Suita)
 former Osaka University of Foreign Studies (Minoh)
 Osaka Kyoiku University (Kashiwara)
 Osaka City University (Osaka city)
 Osaka Prefecture University (Sakai)
 Kansai University (Suita, Takatsuki, Osaka city)
 Kindai University (Higashiosaka)
 Kansai Gaidai University (Hirakata) (Kansai University of Foreign Studies)
 Osaka International Educational University (Moriguchi)
 Osaka University of Health and Sport sciences (Kumatori)
 Osaka University of Commerce (Higashiosaka)
 Osaka University of Economic and Law (Yao)
 Osaka College of Music (Toyonaka)
 Osaka Electro Communication University (Neyagawa)
 Osaka Gakuin University (Suita)
 Otemon Gakuin University (Ibaraki)
 Hannan University (Matsubara)
 Setsunan University (Neyagawa)
 St Andrews University (Momoyama Gakuin University) (Izumi)
 Taisei Gakuin University (Mihara, Sakai)
 Tezukayama Gakuin University (Ōsakasayama, Sakai)

Parks 
 The Expo Commemoration Park (Suita) held the Expo '70. It is about 260 ha and includes a Japanese garden, National Museum of Art, Osaka, and the amusement park "Expoland".
 Hattori Ryokuchi Park (Toyonaka), about 150 ha.
 Tsurumi Ryokuchi Park (Osaka), about 100 ha. The horticulture exposition of Expo '90 was held here.
 Nagai Park (Osaka), about 66 ha. The IAAF World Championships in Athletics were held in 2007 at Nagai Stadium in this park.
 Osaka Castle Park (Osaka), about 106 ha.
 Nakanoshima Park (Osaka), housing the Museum of Oriental Ceramics, public hall, Osaka Prefectural Nakanoshima Library, and the city hall of Osaka.
 Yamadaike Park (Osaka), about 73.7 ha.
 Osaka Prefectural Park (Hirakata), operated by Osaka Prefecture.

Transportation

Rail
 JR Central
 Tokaido Shinkansen (Shin-Osaka Station)
 JR West
 Sanyo Shinkansen (Shin-Osaka Station)
 Osaka Loop Line
 Osaka Higashi Line
 Tokaido Main Line
 JR Kyoto Line
 JR Kobe Line
 Gakkentoshi Line
 Yamatoji Line
 Hanwa Line
 JR Tozai Line
 JR Yumesaki Line
 Kansai Airport Line
 Osaka Metro
 Midosuji Line
 Tanimachi Line
 Yotsubashi Line
 Chuo Line
 Sennichimae Line
 Sakaisuji Line
 Nagahori Tsurumi-ryokuchi Line
 Imazatosuji Line
 Keihan Electric Railway
 Keihan Main Line
 Keihan Nakanoshima Line
 Keihan Katano Line
 Kintetsu
 Osaka Line
 Nara Line
 Shigi Line
 Keihanna Line
 Minami Osaka Line
 Domyoji Line
 Nagano Line
 Hankyu
 Hankyu Kyoto Line
 Hankyu Senri Line
 Hankyu Takarazuka Line
 Hankyu Minoo Line
 Hankyu Kobe Line
 Nose Electric Railway
 Hanshin Electric Railway
 Hanshin Main Line
 Hanshin Namba Line
 Nankai Electric Railway
 Nankai Main Line
 Takashinohama Line
 Tanagawa Line
 Airport Line
 Koya Line
 Senboku Rapid Railway
 Mizuma Railway
 Kita-Osaka Kyuko Railway

People movers 
 Osaka Monorail
 Nanko Port Town Line

Road

Expressways

 Meishin Expressway
 Chugoku Expressway
 Hanshin Expressway
 Nishi-Meihan Expressway
 Second Keihan Highway
 Hanwa Expressway
 Second Hanna Highway
 Minami Hanna Highway

National highways

 National Route 1
 National Route 2
 National Route 25
 National Route 26
 National Route 43
 National Route 163
 National Route 165
 National Route 166
 National Route 168
 National Route 170
 National Route 171
 National Route 173
 National Route 176
 National Route 307
 National Route 308
 National Route 309
 National Route 310
 National Route 371
 National Route 423
 National Route 477
 National Route 479
 National Route 480
 National Route 481

Airports
 Osaka International Airport - Domestic flights
 Kansai International Airport - International and domestic flights

Sports 

The sports teams listed below are based in Osaka.

Football (soccer)

League
 Gamba Osaka  
 Cerezo Osaka

Non-league
F.C. Osaka

Baseball 
 Orix Buffaloes
 Hanshin Tigers

Basketball 
 Osaka Evessa

Volleyball 
 Osaka Blazers Sakai  
 Suntory Sunbirds  
 Panasonic Panthers

Rugby union
Red Hurricanes Osaka
Hanazono Liners

Prefectural symbols 
The symbol of Osaka Prefecture, called the sennari byōtan or "thousand gourds," was originally the crest of Toyotomi Hideyoshi, the feudal lord of Osaka Castle.

See also 
 List of twin towns and sister cities in Japan
 Osaka Culture Prize
 Osaka Eco Agricultural Products
 Osaka Metropolis plan
 Politics of Osaka

Notes

References
 Nussbaum, Louis-Frédéric and Käthe Roth. (2005).  Japan encyclopedia. Cambridge: Harvard University Press. ;  OCLC 58053128

External links 

 Official Osaka Prefecture homepage
 Osaka Tourism & Convention Guidance homepage
 Comprehensive Database of Archaeological Site Reports in Japan

 

Kansai region
Prefectures of Japan